The following is a list of arcade games developed and published by Sega, many on their arcade system boards. In addition to making its own games, Sega has licensed out its arcade systems to third party publishers. This list comprises all of the games released on these arcade system boards. Sega had been producing electro-mechanical games since the 1960s, arcade video games since the early 1970s, and unified arcade systems since the late 1970s.

Electro-mechanical games

Arcade video games

Early video games

Sega Laserdisc series 
The following are laserdisc games that ran on Sega Laserdisc arcade hardware.

Sega System series 
Every game listed here was released in Japan.

Sega Model series 
Every game listed here was released in Japan.

Sega Titan Video

Sega NAOMI series

PlayStation 2-based 
Every game listed here was released in Japan.

Xbox-based 
Every game listed here was released in Japan.

GameCube-based 
Every game listed here was released in Japan.

PC-based

Medal games 
Medal games are only released in Japan.

See also 

 Lists of Sega games
 List of Sega Master System games
 List of Sega Mega Drive and Sega Genesis games
 List of Game Gear games
 List of Sega Mega-CD games
 List of Sega 32X games
 List of Sega Saturn games
 List of Dreamcast games

References

Notes

External links 
 Sega Products Page
 System 16 Museum
 Arcade History Museum

 
Sega arcade games
arcade